Zimbabwe's national cricket team toured India from 15 February to 19 March 2002. Tour included a series of 2 Tests and 5 One day internationals. India won the Test series by 2-0 and ODI series by 3-2.

Tour match

Test series

1st Test

2nd Test

ODI series

1st ODI

2nd ODI

3rd ODI

4th ODI

5th ODI

References

External links 

International cricket competitions in 2001–02
2002 in Indian cricket
2002 in Zimbabwean cricket
Zimbabwean cricket tours of India
Indian cricket seasons from 2000–01